S. Yesudas (10 September 1931 – 20 November 2022) known by his stage name Aaroor Dass, was an Indian stage, film and television Screenwriter who was active in Tamil cinema during the latter part of the 20th century. Aaroor Dass has written the story and dialogues for over 1000 films, who dominate the Tamil film for more than 40 years. He wrote his first film for actor Sivaji Ganesan's Pasamalar (1961). He debuted as a director with the film Penn Endral Penn (1967).

Early life
Dass was born on 10 September 1931 to Sathyagu and Arockiya Mary as Yesudas at Thiruvarur, Nagapattinam. He had three younger brothers and three younger sisters. Aaroor Dass attended Thiruvarur Jilla Board Higher Secondary School. Aaroor refers to Thiruvarur.

Career
Dass started his career as an assistant to Thanjai N. Ramaiah Dass in 1955 and assisted in writing the dialogues for the film called Naattiya Thara. He has said that he named his first child as Arokyamary and also gave a pet name, Thara Devi in remembrance of this film. He wrote his debut film as Vaazha Vaitha Deivam (1959) produced by Sandow M. M. A. Chinnappa Thevar. Then, he wrote next film for Sivaji Ganesan's Pasamalar (1961) and continued to write for the thespian in 28 films. When he wrote Pasamalar, Das was 28 years, Sivji Ganesan was 32 and Savitri was 24. He wrote for nearly the same number of M. G. Ramachandran too (including a few that were not released). Dass worked with many top class directors of yesteryears, like A. Bhimsingh, A. C. Tirulokchandar, M. A. Thirumugam and many others. He was associate director under Tirulokchandar and Dever films. He has written stage plays like Thirisoolam and Jenma Thandanai. In June 2022, Aaroor Dass received the Kalaignar Kalaithurai Vithagar Award from the government of Tamil Nadu.

Personal life and death
Dass married Baby, the couple had four children; three daughters Thara, Aasha and Usha and a son Ravichandran. He lived in Nathamuni Street in T. Nagar in Chennai.

Dass died in Chennai on 20 November 2022, at the age of 91.

Filmography

As writer

As director

References

1931 births
2022 deaths
Writers from Tamil Nadu
Tamil screenwriters
20th-century Indian male writers
Dramatists and playwrights from Tamil Nadu
20th-century Indian dramatists and playwrights
Indian male dramatists and playwrights
Indian male screenwriters